The 46th Guldbagge Awards ceremony, presented by the Swedish Film Institute, honored the best Swedish films of 2010 and took place January 24, 2011, at Cirkus in Stockholm. The jury presented Guldbagge Awards (commonly referred to as Bagge) in 15 categories. It was televised in the Sweden by SVT, with actress and comedian Petra Mede as host.

Beyond won awards for Best Director and Best Supporting Actress. Easy Money won for Best Actor and Best Cinematography. Sebbe directed by Babak Najafi, received Best Film.

Winner and nominees

Awards

{| class=wikitable style="width="150%"
|-
| style="vertical-align:top; width:50%;"|

 Sebbe – Rebecka Lafrenz and Mimmi Spång Beyond – Helena Danilesson and Ralf Karlsson
 Simple Simon – Bonnie Skoog Feeney and Jonathan Sjöberg
| style="vertical-align:top; width:50%;"|

 Pernilla August – Beyond
 Lisa Langseth – Pure
 Babak Najafi – Sebbe
|-
| style="vertical-align:top; width:50%;"|

 Alicia Vikander – Pure
 Pernilla August – Miss Kicki
 Noomi Rapace – Beyond
| style="vertical-align:top; width:50%;"|

 Joel Kinnaman – Easy Money
 Sebastian Hiort af Ornäs – Sebbe
 Bill Skarsgård – Simple Simon
|-
| style="vertical-align:top; width:50%;"|

 Outi Mäenpää – Beyond
 Tehilla Blad – Beyond
 Cecilia Forss – Simple Simon
| style="vertical-align:top; width:50%;"|

 Peter Dalle – Behind Blue Skies
 David Dencik – Cornelis
 Ville Virtanen – Beyond
|-
| style="vertical-align:top; width:50%;"|

 Lisa Langseth – Pure
 Andreas Öhman and Jonathan Sjöberg – Simple Simon
 Pernilla August and Lolita Ray – Beyond
| style="vertical-align:top; width:50%;"|

 Aril Wretblad – Easy Money
 Göran Hallberg – Behind Blue Skies
 Erik Molberg Hansen – Beyond
|-
| style="vertical-align:top; width:50%;"|

 Regretters – Marcus Lindeen Kiss Bill – Emelie Wallgren and Ina Holmqvist
 Familia – Mikael Wiström and Alberto Herskovits
| style="vertical-align:top; width:50%;"|

 Tussilago – Jonas Odell Tord and Tord – Niki Lindroth von Bahr
 Not Panic – Elisabeth Marjanović Cronvall
|-
| style="vertical-align:top; width:50%;"|

  Lourdes – Jessica Hausner
  The Social Network – David Fincher
  Fish Tank – Andrea Arnold
| style="vertical-align:top; width:50%;"|

 Mona Malm, actress
|-
| style="vertical-align:top; width:50%;"|

 Lisbet Gabrielsson, producer of animated films.
| style="vertical-align:top; width:50%;"|

 House of Angels – Third Time Lucky Balls
 Easy Money
|-
| style="vertical-align:top; width:50%;"|

 Åsa Mossberg, film editor, for her work on Beyond
 Jeanette Klintberg, casting director, for her work Easy Money
 Musician Magnus Börjeson and the directors Johannes Stjärne Nilssonand Ola Simonsson' for their work on Sound of Noise|}

 Multiple nominations and awards 

Among the films that were released in Sweden in 2010, eighteen of them got at least one nomination.

The following films received one or multiple nominations:
 Nine: Beyond Four: Simple Simon, Easy Money Three: Sebbe, Pure Two: Behind Blue SkiesThe following four films received multiple awards:
 Two: Beyond and Easy Money''

See also
 83rd Academy Awards
 68th Golden Globe Awards
 64th British Academy Film Awards
 17th Screen Actors Guild Awards
 16th Critics' Choice Awards
 31st Golden Raspberry Awards

References

External links
Official website
Guldbaggen on Facebook
Guldbaggen on Twitter
46th Guldbagge Awards at Internet Movie Database

2011 in Sweden
2010 film awards
Guldbagge Awards ceremonies
2010s in Stockholm
January 2011 events in Europe